Louise Wotton (born 8 November 1983) is an Australian rules footballer who played for the Collingwood Football Club in the AFL Women's (AFLW).

Early life and state football
Wotton played 13 seasons with the VWFL. In 2014, she announced her retirement from football and took up triathlon training, wanting to compete in the Ironman Triathlon.

In September 2016, Wotton came out of retirement to nominate for the inaugural AFLW draft.

AFL Women's career
She made her debut in round 2, 2017, in a match at IKON Park against .

Wotton was delisted by Collingwood ahead of the 2018 season.

Personal life
Apart from her sports career, Wotton works as a physical education and health teacher at Rowville Secondary College.

Statistics
Statistics are correct to the end of the 2017 season.

|- style="background-color: #eaeaea"
! scope="row" style="text-align:center" | 2017
|style="text-align:center;"|
| 19 || 3 || 0 || 0 || 2 || 2 || 4 || 1 || 5 || 0.0 || 0.0 || 0.7 || 0.7 || 1.3 || 0.3 || 1.7
|- class="sortbottom"
! colspan=3| Career
! 3
! 0
! 0
! 2
! 2
! 4
! 1
! 5
! 0.0
! 0.0
! 0.7
! 0.7
! 1.3
! 0.3
! 1.7
|}

References

External links

 

Living people
1983 births
Collingwood Football Club (AFLW) players
Australian rules footballers from Melbourne
Sportswomen from Victoria (Australia)
Australian schoolteachers
Victorian Women's Football League players